Marty Adams is a Canadian television and film actor/writer and comedian.

He began a football program at McMaster University but injured his knee. His sister encouraged him to get involved in a comedy program at Humber College which got him his first major comedy gig in the Facebook of Revelations at The Second City. His last Second City main stage show was "0% Down, 100% Screwed", leaving the main stage on 21 June 2009.

TV appearances include seventeen episodes (as of 25 August 2010) of Video on Trial

Film roles include a mockumentary called Now Magazine The Movie and Saw IV.

References

External links

Comedians from Ontario
Canadian male television actors
Canadian television personalities
21st-century Canadian male actors
People from Parry Sound, Ontario
Living people
Year of birth missing (living people)
Canadian male comedians
Canadian comedy writers